Margarita Vladimirovna Volodina (born 1938 in Leningrad) is a Soviet film and stage actress.

Her first husband was film director Samson Samsonov.

In 1994 she went to her daughter to France, living in Paris.

Awards
 Best Actress of the USSR for the magazine Soviet Screen (1963)
 Honored Artist of the RSFSR (1965)
 People's Artist of the RSFSR (1973)

Selected filmography
 Miles of Fire as Katerina Gavrilovna (1957)
 A Sleepless Night as Nina (1960)
Amphibian Man as Canary in a bar (1961)
 An Optimistic Tragedy as Commissar (1962)
 Each Evening at Eleven as Lyuda (1969)
 The Last Victim as  Yuliya Pavlovna Tugina (1975)
 Late Meeting as Masha, Gushin's wife (1979)
 Time and the Conways as Kay (1984)

References

External links
 
 Программа Виталия Вульфа «Мой серебряный шар»

1938 births
Living people
Actresses from Saint Petersburg
People's Artists of the RSFSR
Soviet film actresses
Soviet stage actresses
Soviet television actresses
Moscow Art Theatre School alumni
20th-century Russian actresses